The John Davey House is a historic structure located in Kent, Ohio, United States.  It has been listed on the National Register of Historic Places since May 29, 1975.  An example of Second Empire architecture, the house is best known for being the home of John Davey, a pioneer in the science of tree surgery and the founder of the Davey Tree Expert Company.  It is located on a hill at 338 Woodard Avenue in northwest Kent and was built around 1880. Davey called the house "Birdmount."

See also
 History of Kent, Ohio
 National Register of Historic Places listings in Portage County, Ohio

References

National Register of Historic Places in Portage County, Ohio
History of Kent, Ohio
Second Empire architecture in Ohio
Houses completed in 1880
Houses on the National Register of Historic Places in Ohio
Houses in Portage County, Ohio